The 1965–66 Albanian National Championship was the 28th season of the Albanian National Championship, the top professional league for association football clubs, since its establishment in 1930.

17 Nëntori won the Albanian National Championship.

League table

Note: '17 Nëntori' is Tirana, 'Labinoti' is Elbasani, 'Lokomotiva Durrës' is Teuta, 'Traktori' is Lushnja

Results

Final

References

Albania - List of final tables (RSSSF)

Kategoria Superiore seasons
1
Albania